The 1940–41 Nationalliga A season was the third season of the Nationalliga A, the top level of ice hockey in Switzerland. Five teams participated in the league, and HC Davos won the championship

Standings

External links
 Championnat de Suisse 1940/41

Swiss
National League (ice hockey) seasons
1940–41 in Swiss ice hockey